Decca Presents Selections from George Gershwin's folk opera Porgy and Bess consists of two volumes of records, the first from 1940, and the next from 1942.

The 1940 album was the first to record selections from George Gershwin's opera Porgy and Bess as sung by members of the original Broadway cast from 1935. The only singers involved were Todd Duncan as Porgy and Anne Brown as Bess.  Duncan sang "It Ain't Necessarily So", which is sung in the opera by Sportin' Life. Anne Brown sang "Summertime" (first sung in the opera by Clara) and "My Man's Gone Now" (sung in the opera by Serena). Decca Records originally released this first volume on 4 twelve-inch 78 rpm shellac records assigned the numbers 29067, 29068, 29069 and 29070.

After Porgy and Bess was revived on Broadway in 1942, Decca brought the cast from the revival together to record more songs not already recorded two years earlier, issuing a new "Volume Two."   This recording originally came on 3 ten-inch shellac records, which Decca Records assigned the numbers 23250, 23251 and 23252.

A few years later, Decca re-released the albums as on LP set entitled Selections from Porgy and Bess in February 1950, (DL 7006), deceptively billing it as "the original cast album" though only selected members of two separate casts participated.

Cast
Todd Duncan (Porgy) (Sportin Life in "It Ain't Necessarily So")
Anne Brown (Bess) (Clara in "Summertime") (Serena in "My Man's Gone Now")
Avon Long (Sportin' Life)
Edward Matthews (Jake)
Helen Dowdy (Strawberry Woman)
William Woolfolk (Crab Man)
Georgette Harvey (Maria)
Gladys Goode
Eva Jessye Choir
Decca Symphony Orchestra
Alexander Smallens, conductor

Track listing

Combination LP (February 1950)

1940s classical albums
Decca Records albums
Albums conducted by Alexander Smallens
Porgy and Bess music recordings
1940 albums
1942 albums